Nqobile 'Bili' Mansuet Ntuli (born 15 January 1996) is a South African field hockey player who plays as a forward for the South African national team.

His brother, Siphesihle, was the assistant coach of the South African national hockey team at the Tokyo 2020 Olympics.

Career

Under–18
Ntuli made hem debut for the South Africa U–18 in 2014 at the Youth Olympic Games in Nanjing.

Under–21
Ntuli made hem debut for the South Africa U–21 in 2016 at the Junior Africa Cup and Junior World Cup.

National team
Ntuli was a part of the South African squad which won the 2017 Africa Cup of Nations, which meant they qualified for the 2018 World Cup. He represented South Africa at the 2018 Commonwealth Games. In October 2018 he was selected in the South Africa squad for the 2018 World Cup.

Honours

Club
2019 PHL Men - Player of the Tournament

National
  2014 Africa Youth Olympic Games Qualifying Tournament (U18M) - Leading Goalscorer
 2016 Men's Hockey Junior Africa Cup - Leading Goalscorer
 2022 Men's Hockey Africa Cup of Nations - Player of the tournament

References

External links
 
 
 

1996 births
Living people
South African male field hockey players
Male field hockey forwards
Field hockey players at the 2014 Summer Youth Olympics
Field hockey players at the 2018 Commonwealth Games
2018 Men's Hockey World Cup players
Olympic field hockey players of South Africa
Field hockey players at the 2020 Summer Olympics
Harvestehuder THC players
Expatriate field hockey players
South African expatriate sportspeople in Germany
Place of birth missing (living people)
Commonwealth Games competitors for South Africa
Alumni of Kearsney College
TuksHockey Club players
Field hockey players at the 2022 Commonwealth Games
21st-century South African people
2023 Men's FIH Hockey World Cup players